Mollens may refer to:

Mollens, Valais, Switzerland
Mollens, Vaud, Switzerland